The LAX Consolidated Rent-A-Car Facility (or ConRAC) is an under-construction consolidated rental car facility for the Los Angeles International Airport (LAX).

History 
The Los Angeles International Airport Consolidated Rent-A-Car (LAX ConRAC) facility is one of the major components of the airport's  Landside Access Modernization Program, along with the LAX Automated People Mover (APM). The $1 billion facility will consolidate rental car operations currently spread across the Westchester neighborhood of Los Angeles. Before the construction of the ConRAC, these rental car companies operated 3,200 daily shuttle trips around the Central Terminal Area and on streets around LAX.

The facility was built by a public–private partnership known as LAX ConRAC Partners, a consortium of 11 companies led by PCL Construction. Los Angeles World Airports (LAWA), the operator of LAX, awarded the consortium a $2 billion contract, with the construction and operations phases of the facility each costing about $1 billion.

A ceremonial groundbreaking was held on September 12, 2019. The  facility will be the largest rental car facility in the world when it opens. The facility was topped out July 12, 2021. The ConRAC facility has been designed to achieve a LEED Silver rating with sustainable elements including native drought-tolerant landscaping, reclaimed water usage and a solar farm generating approximately 8,400 megawatt hours annually.

The focal point of the ConRAC is the five-story ready/return building, at which customers pick up and return vehicles. This building also includes a station on the LAX Automated People Mover line. There is also a quick turnaround (QTA) building used for the light maintenance of vehicles such as fuelling, car washing, oil changes and tire rotation. By keeping operations within the footprint of the facility, the QTA building will help in minimizing traffic congestion on the roads.

In 2018, LAWA signed 20-year base leases with rental car companies to use the ConRAC. The ready/return building was handed over to tenants on June 6, 2022. Contractors for the car rental companies will construct their rental counters, waiting areas, office spaces and entry/exit booths. 

As of June 2022, work was underway to build access roads into and out of the facility and complete the Quick Turn Around building. The facility is scheduled to be operational in summer 2023.

Operations 
The facility will host five rental car companies representing 13 brands, including Avis Budget Group (which operates Avis Car Rental, Budget Rent a Car, Payless Car Rental and Zipcar), Enterprise Holdings (which operates Enterprise Rent-A-Car, Alamo Rent a Car and National Car Rental), Europcar (which operates Europcar and Fox Rent A Car), The Hertz Corporation (which operates Hertz Rent A Car, Dollar Rent A Car and Thrifty Car Rental), and Sixt. Smaller rental car companies who choose not to relocate will pick up their customers curbside on the west side of the ConRAC facility.

People Mover hours and frequency 
The APM is expected to operate 24 hours a day. During peak hours (9 a.m. to 11 p.m.) trains will arrive every two minutes. From the LAX ConRAC, it will take 10 minutes to reach the West Central Terminal Area (CTA) station.

References 

Los Angeles International Airport
Westchester, Los Angeles
LAX Automated People Mover stations
Car rental